Harry Styles is an English singer, songwriter, and actor who has won 88 awards from 135 nominations (including pending awards). Styles' music career began in 2010 as a member of the boy band One Direction,  who have received numerous awards and nominations. Styles has won three BMI London Awards for co-writing songs for the band. Following the group's indefinite hiatus in 2016, he signed a solo record deal with Columbia Records and released his debut single, "Sign of the Times" the following year. It won the Brit Award for British Video of the Year and the IHeartRadio Music Award for Best Music Video. He released his eponymous debut studio album in 2017, which earned him the ARIA Award for Best International Artist.

In 2019, Styles' second studio album, Fine Line, was preceded by the release of two singles, "Lights Up" and "Adore You". The former won Best Song at the 2020 Global Awards, while the latter garnered three nominations at the 2020 MTV Video Music Awards. Fine Line won the American Music Award for Favorite Pop/Rock Album and the Juno Award for International Album of the Year, and received a nomination for British Album of the Year at the 2020 Brit Awards. At the 63rd Annual Grammy Awards, Styles was nominated in three categories including Best Pop Vocal Album for Fine Line and Best Music Video for "Adore You". The fourth single from Fine Line, "Watermelon Sugar", won Best Pop Solo Performance at the same ceremony. In 2020, Styles received the Billboard Chart Achievement Award at the Billboard Music Awards ceremony. Awarded 5 iHeartRadio Music Awards along with the accomplishment of reaching 1 Billion Total Audience Spins for “Adore You”, “Watermelon Sugar” & “As It Was”.

Outside music, Styles starred in Christopher Nolan's epic war film, Dunkirk (2017), for which he received two acting ensemble nominations at the Critics' Choice Movie Awards and the Washington D.C. Area Film Critics Association Awards. He is also known for his flamboyant fashion, for which he has won a Fashion Award and six Teen Choice Awards.


Awards and nominations

Notes

References

External links
 List of awards and nominations at the Internet Movie Database

Styles, Harry
Awards